Jay Brian Schroeder (born June 28, 1961) is an American former professional football player who was a quarterback in the National Football League (NFL). He played college football at UCLA, after which he was selected in the third round (83rd overall) of the 1984 NFL draft by the Washington Redskins where he played for four seasons. He then played for the Los Angeles Raiders for five seasons and spent one season each with the Cincinnati Bengals and Arizona Cardinals.

While with the Washington Redskins, Schroeder was selected to the Pro Bowl after the 1986 season. He also won a Super Bowl when the Redskins defeated the Denver Broncos in Super Bowl XXII.

American football career
Schroeder attended Palisades High School and was a high school football teammate of actor Forest Whitaker.

He was a third round draft pick in the 1984 NFL Draft by Washington after a college career at UCLA, in which he started only one game. He did produce a memorable moment, throwing a game-winning touchdown pass on a deflection to future NFL star Freeman McNeil to beat arch-rival USC. He also played minor league baseball in the Pioneer League.

Schroeder replaced injured Joe Theismann in a Monday Night Football game against the New York Giants on November 18, 1985. Schroeder's first pass after Theismann was taken off the field was a 43-yard completion to Art Monk. The Redskins came close to a touchdown after the catch, but a fumble by John Riggins inside the five yard line was recovered by Lawrence Taylor. Washington eventually won the game, 23–21.

Schroeder led the Redskins to a 4–1 record after that game. He gained the starting spot on the Redskins for the 1986 NFL season, and led them to a 12–4 record while throwing for a then team record 4,109 passing yards, a team record which stood for 29 years, but he remains the third all time leader in single season passing for Washington. He led Washington to the NFC title game where they were shut out 17–0 by the New York Giants.

The following season, Schroeder suffered a separated shoulder in the first game against the Philadelphia Eagles and was replaced by Doug Williams. Williams disliked Schroeder for pointedly waving him off the field when head coach Joe Gibbs thought Schroeder had been injured and sent Williams in as a precaution. Schroeder returned that season, but was continually nagged by the injury, allowing the more popular Williams to gain the starting position for the Redskins' playoff run.

Williams led the Redskins to a championship victory that year in Super Bowl XXII. Schroeder was traded the following season for Raiders tackle Jim Lachey, who proved to be a perennial Pro Bowl player for the Redskins. Schroeder spent five seasons with the Raiders. In 1990, he led Los Angeles to the AFC championship where the Raiders lost to the Buffalo Bills 51–3 as Schroeder threw five interceptions.

Todd Marinovich replaced him for one regular season and one playoff contest in the 1991 season, and Jeff Hostetler arrived in 1993 after Schroeder was waived.

Schroeder retired in 1995 with 1,426 of 2,808 completions for 20,063 yards and 114 touchdowns, with 108 interceptions, while also rushing for 761 yards and five touchdowns.

Baseball career
Schroeder began his sports career in the Toronto Blue Jays minor league system. He was drafted 3rd overall in the 1979 Major League Baseball Draft by the Blue Jays. He had a career batting average of .213 in the minors. He was inducted in the Kinston Professional Baseball Hall of Fame in 1996.

Coaching career
Starting in 2000, Schroeder was an offensive coordinator at Christian High School in El Cajon, California, a suburb of San Diego, under Head Coach Matt Oliver. In 2007, he coached at Desert Hills High School serving as both the Offensive Coordinator and Quarterbacks Coach. He then became an assistant coach for Oaks Christian High School in California. 

In December 2010, Schroeder was hired as the Director of Football Operations at Village Christian School in Sun Valley, California. He also coached Varsity and JV golf at Village Christian.

He has also occasionally worked as an analyst for Sky Sports' NFL coverage since November 2007.

Jay was formerly the quarterbacks coach at Desert Hills High School in St. George, Utah.

He is currently doing radio Live in various parts of Las Vegas/Henderson area with long time Las Vegas CBS Sportscaster Rich Perez on Social media, Las Vegas primarily on Sundays live at Carlos and Charlies inside the Flamingo hotel at 12:00–1:00 and Super Bowl Sunday 1:00–2:00pm.

References

External links
 Baseball Stats from The Baseball Cube

American people of German descent
Players of American football from Milwaukee
Baseball players from Milwaukee
American football quarterbacks
UCLA Bruins football players
Washington Redskins players
Los Angeles Raiders players
Cincinnati Bengals players
Arizona Cardinals players
National Conference Pro Bowl players
Florence Blue Jays players
Kinston Blue Jays players
Medicine Hat Blue Jays players
1961 births
Living people